In quantum gravity, a virtual black hole is a hypothetical micro black hole that exists temporarily as a result of a quantum fluctuation of spacetime.  It is an example of quantum foam and is the gravitational analog of the virtual electron–positron pairs found in quantum electrodynamics. Theoretical arguments suggest that virtual black holes should have mass on the order of the Planck mass, lifetime around the Planck time, and occur with a number density of approximately one per Planck volume.

The emergence of virtual black holes at the Planck scale is a consequence of the uncertainty relation

These uncertainty relations are another form of Heisenberg's uncertainty principle at the Planck scale.

If virtual black holes exist, they provide a mechanism for proton decay. This is because when a black hole's mass increases via mass falling into the hole, and is theorized to decrease when Hawking radiation is emitted from the hole, the elementary particles emitted are, in general, not the same as those that fell in.  Therefore, if two of a proton's constituent quarks fall into a virtual black hole, it is possible for an antiquark and a lepton to emerge, thus violating conservation of baryon number.

The existence of virtual black holes aggravates the black hole information loss paradox, as any physical process may potentially be disrupted by interaction with a virtual black hole.

See also
 Quantum foam
 Virtual particle
 Quantum tunnelling

References

Quantum gravity
Black holes